Connecticut's 148th House of Representatives district elects one member of the Connecticut House of Representatives. It encompasses parts of Stamford and has been represented by Democrat Anabel Figueroa since 2023.

Recent elections

2023 Special

2022

2020

2018

2016

2014

2012

References

148